This is a list of members of the South Australian House of Assembly from 1953 to 1956, as elected at the 1953 state election:

 The LCL member for Mitcham, Henry Dunks, died on 22 March 1955. LCL candidate Robin Millhouse won the resulting by-election on 7 May.
 The LCL member for Eyre, Arthur Christian, died on 8 January 1956. No by-election was held due to the imminent 1956 state election.

Members of South Australian parliaments by term
20th-century Australian politicians